Michael Joseph Holovak (September 19, 1919 – January 27, 2008) was an American football player, coach, and executive.  He played college football at Boston College, where he was an All-American at fullback in 1942.

Holovak was the fifth overall selection of the 1943 NFL Draft by the Cleveland Rams.  After serving in the U.S. Navy during World War II, he played in the National Football League (NFL) with the Rams in 1946, who had moved to Los Angeles, then with the Chicago Bears in 1947 and 1948.  Holovak was the freshman coach at his alma mater Boston College, then was head coach of the varsity from 1951 through 1959, compiling a 49–29–3 record.

In 1960, he joined the Boston Patriots of the new American Football League (AFL) as an assistant under head coach Lou Saban, coaching the offensive backfield.  Holovak took over as head coach for the final nine games in 1961 after Saban was fired after a 2–3 start, and remained as head coach through 1968.  In 1976, he served one game as head coach for the New York Jets.  He was also the general manager of the Houston Oilers from 1989 to 1993.  Holovak was inducted into the College Football Hall of Fame as a player in 1985.

Early life and playing career
Holovak, one of six children and the youngest of five sons of Slovak/Hungarian/Ruthenian immigrants, grew up in the coal mining town of Lansford, Pennsylvania. During his high school playing days, he helped defeat a team coached by future legend Vince Lombardi.

College career
Playing collegiately at Boston College for three years beginning in 1940, Holovak was a starter at running back at under head coaches Frank Leahy and Denny Myers, averaging more than five yards per carry. During his sophomore year, the undefeated Eagles competed in the Sugar Bowl in New Orleans.

Two years later, Holovak served as co-captain of the Eagles' squad that entered the final weeks of the 1942 campaign as the top-ranked college team in the country. However, on November 28 they were upset by arch-rival  Holy Cross, a defeat that canceled a victory party that night at Boston's Cocoanut Grove hotel. That decision proved to be chillingly profound when a horrendous fire swept through the building that night with 492 fatalities and hundreds more injured.

The team regrouped to compete in the Orange Bowl in Miami, a contest in which he rushed for 158 yards on just 10 carries and scored a record-setting three touchdowns. He earned consensus first-team All-American honors and was fourth in the voting for the Heisman Trophy.

Professional career
On April 8, 1943, the Cleveland Rams, who had earlier announced they were suspending operations for the duration of World War II, selected Holovak in the fifth overall in the 1943 NFL Draft. Holovak then enlisted in the U.S. Navy and attended Officer Candidate School.  He went on to command a PT boat that sank nine Japanese ships, and later battling malaria. However, despite his heroics, he was dealt a heavy personal blow when one of his brothers lost his life during the four-year conflict.

Holovak officially signed with the Rams on December 29, 1944, but didn't take the field until 1946, by which time the franchise had relocated to Los Angeles. During his one season with the team, he gained 211 yards and scored three touchdowns.

Traded to the Chicago Bears on January 27, 1947, Holovak would lead the pass-oriented Windy City squad in rushing during each of the next two years, also three touchdowns. Prior to the start of his first year with the Bears, Holovak got his first taste of coaching by assisting with the spring practice of University of San Francisco head coach Edward McKeever.

After his two years in Chicago, Holovak retired on March 1, 1949, to become the freshman football coach at his alma mater. After two seasons in which he compiled an undefeated record, he was promoted to head coach at Boston College on December 30, 1950, following the resignation of Myers.

Coaching career
In his first five years, Holovak compiled a mark of 24–16–5, winning Coach of the Year honors in 1954 from New England football writers. Those efforts were good enough to earn him a new four-year contract on November 22, 1955, but even after four more winning seasons, he was fired on December 3, 1959, after a year in which Eagle fans had subjected him to constant verbal abuse.

Two weeks after his dismissal, Holovak signed as a scout with the fledgling Patriots, then was named an assistant under Lou Saban on March 29, 1960. After a 5–9 record that year and a 2-3 start in 1961, Saban was fired on October 10 and replaced by Holovak. His first game as Patriots coach was a 31-31 tie (the first in Patriots history) with the Houston Oilers. Finishing with a 9–4–1 record, Holovak matched that record the following year, earning him a new three-year contract, with an option for another year.

In 1963, the Patriots moved to Fenway Park and finished with a 7–6–1 record. This was good enough for a tie for first place in the Eastern Division, which necessitated a playoff with the other 7-6-1 team in the Buffalo Bills. In the Eastern Division playoff, they prevailed 26–8 to move on to the AFC title game, but they were then pounded 51–10 in the AFL Championship game by the San Diego Chargers. The next year, Holovak added the duties of general manager to his job description, and after the team improved to 10–3–1 (good for second behind Buffalo), he was named AFL Coach of the Year on December 15, 1964, and received a new five-year contract.

However, the veteran unit slipped to 4–8–2 in 1965, but rebounded into contention the next season with the addition of rookie running back Jim Nance. Needing only a victory in their final game against the New York Jets on December 17 to reach the AFL title contest, the Patriots instead saw their 1966 season end with a 38-28 upset loss. The defeat was softened somewhat when Holovak again won the league's Coach of the Year accolade.

Age finally caught up with the team over the next two years with the Patriots managing only a 7–20–1 record. The end result was that Holovak was fired from both positions on January 7, 1969, ending his Patriots tenure with a mark of 53–47–9. As in his previous stint at Boston College, Holovak saw growing fan discontent, including chants of "Goodbye Mike", play a role in the decision.  He would remain the winningest coach in Patriots history until Bill Belichick passed him in 2005.

He would later coach in one game for the New York Jets, replacing Lou Holtz who had resigned before the last game of the 1976 season to return to college as coach of the Arkansas Razorbacks. The Jets lost that game 42-3 to the Cincinnati Bengals.  His overall career record as an NFL head coach was 52–48–9 for .522 winning percentage.

Executive career and later life
After first considering an assistant coaching position with the Oakland Raiders, Holovak instead remained a Patriots scout, but shifted gears somewhat by taking a position with the Massachusetts State Racing Commission. However, just two months later, he left that position to become an assistant with the San Francisco 49ers. Personal tragedy, though, soon intervened when his 18-year-old daughter Ann, one of two girls, was killed in an auto accident on the night of her senior prom on June 13.

After two years with the 49ers, Holovak remained in the Bay Area by accepting the post of receivers coach with the Raiders on March 6, 1971. When the team failed to reach the postseason for the first time in five years, Holovak was let go, but signed as a scout with the New York Jets on July 10, 1972. Returning to sidelines the next year as running backs coach, he then moved into the Jets' front office following the 1974 NFL season as Director of Player Personnel. Holovak worked with Connie Carberg, the NFL's first female scout, during his time with the Jets.

He remained in that role for two seasons, but when Jets head coach Lou Holtz resigned before the final game of the season, Holovak handled the duties in a 42–3 loss to the Cincinnati Bengals on December 12. He then announced his resignation on May 20, 1977, citing personal reasons.

In 1980, he was elected to the National Football Foundation's College Football Hall of Fame, then returned to football on February 15, 1981, when he was named executive vice-president of the Houston Oilers. Rebuilding the team following the departure of popular head coach Bum Phillips, Holovak made his most adept move when he strongly recommended the signing of Canadian Football League quarterback Warren Moon in 1984.

By 1988, Holovak was being phased out by Oilers' general manager Ladd Herzeg, with his duties limited to scouting. However, after Herzeg left in a contract dispute after the season, Holovak was named general manager on February 2, 1989. He remained in that role until the end of 1993 NFL season, but remained a scout for the franchise, which later shifted to Tennessee, until retiring for good in 1999. In an episode of A Football Life that chronicled the 1993 Oilers team, a team riddled with many off-the-field issues, several Oiler personnel criticized the actions taken by the front office (chiefly Holovak and owner Bud Adams) for not taking direct action on the bitter issues that plagued the team, such as the season long feud between defensive and offensive coordinators Buddy Ryan and Kevin Gilbride that eventually turned physical during a nationally televised game. Despite this, the '93 team finished 12–4 (after winning eleven games in a row to close out the season) before receiving an early exit from the Kansas City Chiefs in the divisional playoffs.

On January 27, 2008, Holovak died in Ruskin, Florida from complications from pneumonia. He was 88 years old.  He was laid to rest at Florida's National Cemetery.

Head coaching record

College

NFL/AFL

See also
 List of American Football League players

References

External links
 
 
 

1919 births
2008 deaths
American football fullbacks
Boston College Eagles football coaches
Boston College Eagles football players
Boston Patriots (AFL) coaches
Boston Patriots (AFL) head coaches
Chicago Bears players
Houston Oilers executives
Los Angeles Rams players
National Football League general managers
New England Patriots executives
New England Patriots scouts
New York Jets coaches
Oakland Raiders coaches
San Francisco 49ers coaches
All-American college football players
College Football Hall of Fame inductees
United States Navy officers
United States Navy personnel of World War II
People from Carbon County, Pennsylvania
Coaches of American football from Pennsylvania
Players of American football from Pennsylvania
American people of Hungarian descent
American people of Slovak descent
Burials at Florida National Cemetery
Deaths from pneumonia in Florida
Military personnel from Pennsylvania
New York Jets head coaches